Shereefa Lloyd (born 2 September 1982 in Clarendon Park, Jamaica) is a Jamaican sprinter, who specializes in the 400 metres.

She attended and competed for Texas Tech under coach Wes Kittley.

At the 2007 World Championships Lloyd won a bronze medal in 4 × 400 metres relay, together with teammates Shericka Williams, Davita Prendagast and Novlene Williams. She also reached the semi-final in the individual event, with a personal best time of 51.00 seconds.  She was also part of the Jamaican teams that won the bronze medal at the 2008 and 2012 Summer Olympics.

Achievements

Personal bests
100 metres – 11.50 s (2003)
200 metres – 23.10 s (2004)
400 metres – 51.00 s (2007)

References
 

After retiring form track in 2014. 3 Years later in 2017 Shereefa joined the Army where she was sent to Fort Jackson SC. for basic training. After 10 weeks she graduated basic training in Fort Jackson SC. Then after completing basic training she was sent to Fort Lee VA. where she studied the work of a 92Y for 8 weeks.

1982 births
Living people
People from Clarendon Parish, Jamaica
Jamaican female sprinters
Athletes (track and field) at the 2008 Summer Olympics
Athletes (track and field) at the 2012 Summer Olympics
Olympic athletes of Jamaica
Olympic silver medalists for Jamaica
Athletes (track and field) at the 2007 Pan American Games
Texas Tech Red Raiders women's track and field athletes
World Athletics Championships medalists
Medalists at the 2012 Summer Olympics
Medalists at the 2008 Summer Olympics
Olympic silver medalists in athletics (track and field)
Pan American Games competitors for Jamaica
Olympic female sprinters
20th-century Jamaican women
21st-century Jamaican women